ANC Today is a weekly web-based newsletter published by the African National Congress (ANC). It consists mainly of updates on current programmes and initiatives of the ANC.

In 2001, the ANC launched an online party newspaper ANC Today – Online Voice of the African National Congress to offset the alleged bias of the white-controlled press.

Notes and references

External links 
 

Weekly newspapers published in South Africa
African National Congress